Frigidoalvania is a genus of minute sea snails, marine gastropod mollusks or micromollusks in the family Rissoidae.

Species
Species within the genus Frigidoalvania include:

 Frigidoalvania brychia (A. E. Verrill, 1884)
 Frigidoalvania cruenta (Odhner, 1915)
 Frigidoalvania flavida Golikov & Sirenko, 1998
 Frigidoalvania janmayeni (Friele, 1878)
 Frigidoalvania pelagica (Stimpson, 1851)
 Frigidoalvania thalassae Bouchet & Warén, 1993

References

Rissoidae